Patrick Delice (born 12 November 1967) is a retired athlete from Trinidad and Tobago who specialized in the 200 and 400 metres.

His personal best time over 400 m was 44.58 seconds, achieved in May 1993 in Abilene, TX. He holds one national record, in 4 x 400 metres relay together with Neil de Silva, Alvin Daniel and Ian Morris, with 3:01.05 minutes achieved in the heats of the 1992 Summer Olympics.

International competitions

External links

1967 births
Living people
Trinidad and Tobago male sprinters
Athletes (track and field) at the 1987 Pan American Games
Athletes (track and field) at the 1988 Summer Olympics
Athletes (track and field) at the 1990 Commonwealth Games
Athletes (track and field) at the 1991 Pan American Games
Athletes (track and field) at the 1992 Summer Olympics
Athletes (track and field) at the 1994 Commonwealth Games
Athletes (track and field) at the 1995 Pan American Games
Olympic athletes of Trinidad and Tobago
Commonwealth Games bronze medallists for Trinidad and Tobago
Commonwealth Games medallists in athletics
Central American and Caribbean Games bronze medalists for Trinidad and Tobago
Competitors at the 1993 Central American and Caribbean Games
Central American and Caribbean Games medalists in athletics
Pan American Games competitors for Trinidad and Tobago
Medallists at the 1994 Commonwealth Games